Moechohecyra arctifera is a species of beetle in the family Cerambycidae. It was described by Wang and Chiang in 2002. It is known from China.

References

Crossotini
Beetles described in 2002